Olympia (minor planet designation: 582 Olympia) is a minor planet orbiting the Sun.

References

External links
 
 

Background asteroids
Olympia
Olympia
S-type asteroids (Tholen)
19060123